Raymond Thomas Dalio (born August 8, 1949) is an American billionaire investor and hedge fund manager, who has served as co-chief investment officer of the world's largest hedge fund, Bridgewater Associates, since 1985. He founded Bridgewater in 1975 in New York. A $5 million investment from the World Bank's retirement fund was made within five years. His innovations are regarded as some of the best in the industry, having popularized many commonly used practices, such as risk parity, currency overlay, portable alpha and global inflation-indexed bond management.

Dalio was born in New York City and attended C.W. Post College of Long Island University before receiving an MBA from Harvard Business School in 1973. Two years later, in his apartment, Dalio launched Bridgewater. In 2013, it was listed as the largest hedge fund in the world. In 2020 Bloomberg ranked him the world's 79th-wealthiest person. Dalio is the author of the 2017 book Principles: Life & Work, about corporate management and investment philosophy. It was featured on The New York Times best seller list, where it was called a "gospel of radical transparency."

Early life

Dalio was born in the Jackson Heights neighborhood of New York City's Queens borough. When he was 8, the family moved from Jackson Heights to Manhasset in Nassau County, New York. He is the son of a jazz musician, Marino Dallolio (1911–2002), who "played the clarinet and saxophone at Manhattan jazz clubs such as the Copacabana," and Ann, a homemaker. As a child, Dalio had various odd jobs, including mowing lawns, shoveling snow, and a paper route. He is of Italian descent. At age 12, he started caddying at The Links Golf Club, which was within walking distance of his childhood home. He caddied for many Wall Street professionals during his time there, including Wall Street veteran George Leib. Leib and his wife Isabelle invited Dalio to their Park Avenue apartment for family dinners and holiday gatherings. The couple's son, a Wall Street trader, later gave Dalio a summer job at his trading firm. He began investing at age 12, when he bought shares of Northeast Airlines for $300 and tripled his investment after the airline merged with another company. By the time he reached high school, he had built up an investment portfolio of several thousand dollars. He received a bachelor's degree in finance from Long Island University (C.W. Post College) and an M.B.A. from Harvard Business School in 1973.

Investment career

College 
In his high school years, Dalio was an average student. He found school repetitive and monotonous and saw no practical applications for the skills he was learning. Because of this, he had trouble finding a college at which to enroll. He finally applied and got into C.W. Post College, a campus of Long Island University. He continued to buy and sell stocks in college, but became attracted to something new: commodity futures. Commodity futures had low borrowing requirements at the time, and Dalio knew he could profit more handsomely than with simple stocks. At the same time, he was beginning to enjoy school. With more freedom given to him, he took up transcendental meditation, which he still practices to this day. Through the use of this stress-management technique and a renewed interest in learning, Dalio achieved academic excellence. At the end of his time at C.W. Post College, he was admitted to Harvard Business School.

Graduate school 

After graduating from C.W. Post College, Dalio had a free summer. He took a job as a clerk on the New York Stock Exchange. While there, he witnessed Nixon's decision to take the United States off of the gold standard. Due to the inflation this caused, stock prices on the exchange rose, on average, 33% the following day. These events set in motion the Great Inflation of the 1970s. The combination of easy money policy and abandonment of fiscal discipline set prices soaring. The next summer, after his first year at Harvard, Dalio and his friends created the company that later became Bridgewater Associates. It started off as a small entity, and its goal was to trade commodities. But they lacked experience and the venture yielded little fruit. Although the original Bridgewater failed, Dalio later used the name to start what would become the largest hedge fund in history. The experience of trading commodities later became much more valuable, as the high-interest rates used to break the back of inflation caused the stock market to fall. This caused investors on Wall Street to turn to commodities, which are typically more resilient and thrive during times of inflation.

Professional start 
After graduating from Harvard, Dalio married and started a family. He moved to Wilton, Connecticut, where he lived and traded out of a converted barn. Dalio then worked on the floor of the New York Stock Exchange and traded commodity futures. He later worked as the Director of Commodities at Dominick & Dominick LLC. In 1974 he became a futures trader and broker at Shearson Hayden Stone, a securities firm run by Sandy Weil, who later became famous for building up Citigroup. At the firm, Dalio's job was to advise cattle ranchers, grain producers, and other farmers on how to hedge risks, primarily with futures. But he was largely dissatisfied with Shearson Hayden Stone's hierarchical structure, which reminded him of primary education. He longed for the more freedom-based lifestyle of college. At one point, he paid a stripper to drop her clothes in front of a crowd at the annual convention of the California Food and Grain Growers' Association. His creative ways of blowing off steam continued, and exploded on New Year's Eve in 1974 after he went out drinking with some colleagues, including his boss. After a disagreement with his superior, a drunk Dalio punched him in the face. Soon afterward, he was let go from his job at Shearson Hayden Stone.

Founding of Bridgewater Associates 
Despite his aggressive behavior, numerous clients at Shearson Hayden Stone retained their trust in Dalio, and continued to allow him to manage their money. With this capital, he was able to scrape together the beginnings of his asset management fund. In 1975, he founded Bridgewater Associates out of his two-bedroom New York City apartment. Bridgewater started out as a wealth advisory firm, in which capacity it served numerous corporate clients, mostly retained from Dalio's job at Shearson Hayden Stone. The main areas in which Dalio advised were currencies and interest rates. The company began publishing a paid subscription research report, Daily Observations, in which it analyzed global market trends. Dalio's big break came when McDonald's signed on as a client of his firm. Bridgewater then began to grow rapidly. The firm signed on larger clients, including the pension funds for the World Bank and Eastman Kodak. In 1981 the firm opened an office in Westport, Connecticut, which was where Ray and his wife wanted to start a family. Dalio started to become well-known outside of Wall Street after turning a profit from the 1987 stock market crash. The next year, he appeared on an Oprah Winfrey Show episode titled "Do Foreigners Own America?" In 1991, he launched Bridgewater's flagship strategy, "Pure Alpha", a reference to the Greek letter that, in Wall Street terminology, represents the surcharge a money manager can earn above a particular market benchmark, such as the NASDAQ. In 1996, Dalio launched All Weather, a fund that pioneered a steady, low-risk strategy that later became known as risk parity.

Rise to prominence 

Bridgewater Associates became the world's largest hedge fund in 2005. From 1991 to 2005, it lost money in only three calendar years, and never more than 4%. During the same period, the S&P 500 also had three down years, including a negative return of 22.1% in 2002. The fund grew in size by using the standard hedge fund model, which takes a 2% management fee of assets and 20% of yearly profits accrued from using an investment system. By 2005, Dalio was managing money for extremely large entities, including the $196 billion California Public Employees' Retirement System (CalPERS), the $27 billion Pennsylvania State Employees' Retirement System| (Penn SERS or SERS), Melbourne-based National Australia Bank Ltd. and the pension fund of Hartford, Connecticut-based United Technologies Corp. In 2007, Bridgewater suggested there might be a global financial crisis, and in 2008 Dalio published "How the Economic Machine Works: A Template for Understanding What is Happening Now", an essay assessing the potential of various economies by various criteria. The firm's total assets under management increased to $50 billion in 2007 (up from $33 billion seven years earlier).

According to a 2007 article in Barron's magazine, "nobody was better prepared for the global market crash" than Bridgewater's clients and subscribers to its Daily Observations. The company "began sounding alarms...in the spring of 2007 about the dangers of excessive financial leverage." Researchers at the firm examined the public records of most of the world's largest financial entities and discovered that estimated future liabilities related to bad debts totaled $839 billion. When Dalio met with U.S. Treasury Department staff and other White House economic advisors in December, these findings were disclosed but were largely ignored. Due to this research, Bridgewater's Pure Alpha fund avoided much of the 2008 stock market implosion for its investors. In 2008, a disastrous year for many of Bridgewater’s rivals, the firm’s flagship Pure Alpha fund rose in value by 9.5% after accounting for fees. Dalio did this by anticipating that the Federal Reserve would be forced to print a lot of money to revive the economy. He went long on Treasury bonds, shorted the dollar, and bought gold and other commodities. During his 2008 presidential campaign, John McCain paid a visit to the firm and spoke to staff. The next year was not as bright. In 2009, when economic growth was higher than expected and the Dow Jones Industrial Average increased by 19%, the company's Pure Alpha fund reportedly earned just 2% to 4%.

In 2011, Dalio self-published a 123-page volume, Principles, that outlines his philosophy of investment and corporate management. By that same year, Dalio was managing money for the SERS, Kodak, General Motors and the Government Investment Corporation of Singapore. In 2012, he appeared on the annual Time 100 list of the 100 most influential people in the world. In 2011 and 2012, Bloomberg Markets listed him as one of the 50 Most Influential people. Under Dalio's leadership, Bridgewater's Pure Alpha II had just three losing years in its history, with an average return of 10.4%. A stake in Bridgewater Associates Intermediate Holdings, LP was purchased by the Teacher Retirement System of Texas (TRS) for $250 million in February 2012. This stake was non-voting and thus provided the pension fund with very little control of corporate governance. Institutional Investor's Alpha ranked Dalio No. 2 on its 2012 Rich List. Dalio has controlled Bridgewater Associates alongside co-chief investment officers Bob Prince and Greg Jensen since its inception. The hedge fund recently announced plans to reorganize as a partnership. Dalio said the reason for this was the continued sustainability and profit-sharing of the company. Dalio was co-CEO of Bridgewater for 10 months before announcing in March 2017 that he would step down as part of a company-wide shakeup by April 15. The company had been in a seven-year management and equity transition to find a replacement. Jon Rubinstein, co-CEO of the fund, was announced to step down with Dalio, but would retain an advisory role. As of October 2017 Bridgewater Associates had $160 billion in assets under management. In reference to the personality that led him to investment success, Dalio has said that he considers himself a "hyperrealist", and that he is motivated to understand the mechanisms that dictate how the world actually functions, without adding in abstract value judgments.

Investment philosophy 
Dalio uses multiple strategies with Bridgewater Associates, allocating capital to each as he sees fit. According to Dalio, Bridgewater Associates is a "global macro firm", investing around economic trends, such as changes in exchange rates, inflation, and G.D.P. growth. The New Yorker called Dalio “a big-picture thinker connected to a street-smart trader". Dalio divides his holdings into two different areas: beta investments and alpha investments. Beta investments produce returns through passive management and normal market risk. Alpha investments are actively managed and aim to generate better returns than beta investments. Alpha investments are not related to the general market. Dalio uses "quantitative" investment methods to identify new investments while avoiding unrealistic historical models. Dalio's goal is to structure portfolios with uncorrelated investment returns based on risk allocations rather than asset allocations. Dalio's hedge fund mostly accepts money from institutional clients such as pension funds, foundations, endowments, and central banks. Private investors can rarely invest in Dalio's holdings.

When it comes to application, Dalio translates his market insights into algorithms, much like fellow quantitative hedge fund managers David Elliot Shaw and Jim Simons. His strategy mainly focuses on currency and fixed income markets. This is in contrast to buying individual shares in companies, like investors such as Warren Buffett and Peter Lynch. Dalio also popularized the risk parity approach, which he uses for risk management and diversification within Bridgewater Associates. Dalio employs an investment strategy that blends conventional diversification with "wagers on or against markets around the world" according to Bloomberg. Dalio's risk parity approach allows for both leverage and external diversification when investing, as well as short selling. This allows Dalio to use any asset combination he chooses when investing. Dalio's strategy uses an optimal risk target level as its basis for investing. This is in contrast to first allocating capital and then achieving a risk target. Dalio implements this strategy by using leverage to evenly distribute exposure across various asset classes while maintaining the best risk target level. Dalio began using the term "d-process" in February 2009 to describe the deleveraging and deflationary process of the subprime mortgage industry as distinct from a recession, and subsequently incorporated the term into his investment philosophy. Dalio's exact investment portfolios are largely kept a secret from the outside world. This includes most employees as well as external investors, and only a dozen people within his firm understand how it trades at a given time.

Views

Capitalism 
While Dalio has stated that capitalism is generally the best economic system, he has argued that it needs to be reformed due to it "not working well for most Americans". In April 7, 2019, Dalio said on 60 Minutes that income inequality in the United States was a national emergency requiring reform. In July 2019, he again called for refinement of capitalism and called wealth inequality a national emergency. In November 2019, he posted a blog entry stating that excess capital, unfunded social liabilities, and government deficits had created a recipe for disaster, in what he called a "paradigm shift". In May 2020, he stressed the importance of reforming capitalism, not abandoning it, saying, "As the current crisis unfolds, we should remember that throughout history, capitalism has proven to be the best system, though it can sometimes be highly flawed." In October 2020, Dalio said that there has been little income growth for average citizens over the preceding two decades, with the bottom 60% of workers having no inflation-adjusted income growth since the 1980s. He mentioned that income inequality was at its highest level since the 1930s, when the top 1% of earners had more wealth than the bottom 99% combined. Dalio said that the odds of a low-wage earner moving to a higher level of wealth were decreasing over time and that this demonstrated Americans' lower economic and social mobility. He warned that inequality was becoming more entrenched and rising fast. He said that a hypothetical improved capitalism would have to be good at creating a bigger pie and redistributing it as well.

China 

In October 2020, Dalio cautioned people to not be blind to China's rise, arguing that it had continued to emerge as a global superpower. He claimed that China had succeeded in "exceptional ways", including high economic performance in spite of the COVID-19 pandemic, some of the lowest COVID-19 case rates, and being the center of half of all listed initial public offerings globally. Dalio asserted that when he visited China in 1984, high-ranking officials would marvel at basic technology such as calculators, calling them "miracle devices". He argued that China was now on a par with the U.S. in advanced technologies and would probably take the lead in the next five years. In addition, Dalio said that there were many indicators that favored China. He discussed the growing population of well-educated citizens, as well as China's continued growth in the absorption and processing of data, which many headlines have called "the new oil". Dalio also called China favorable from an investor's perspective. He said that the Chinese economy's fundamentals were strong and its assets relatively attractively priced. Dalio also maintained that China's stocks and bonds were currently underweighted in terms of the global portfolio, and that the U.S. was bloated. A natural shift in pricing would give China another comparative advantage. While stressing that things could always go wrong, Dalio stated that he believed China's path of economic reform would continue, bringing it unabated prosperity. He also downplayed and denied Chinese human rights violations, instead likening the Chinese government to a "strict parent". Dalio's stance on China has garnered criticism.

In August 2022, Ray Dalio's Bridgewater wiped its portfolio clean of almost all Chinese stocks, including Alibaba, Bilibili, NetEase, JD.com, DiDi Global.

Personal life

Family 

Dalio lives with his wife Barbara, a descendant of sculptor Gertrude Vanderbilt Whitney, in Greenwich, Connecticut. They have four sons. Their oldest son, Devon, died in an automobile accident in 2020 at age 42. Their second son, Paul Dalio (born 1979), is a film director.

Health 

Dalio has suffered from Barrett's esophagus, a form of gastroesophageal reflux disease (GERD), a pre-malignant condition that if not treated properly can lead to cancer.

Wealth 

In 2011, Dalio was the subject of John Cassidy's New Yorker article "Mastering the Machine". In 2015, Forbes estimated his net worth at $15.4 billion, making him the second-wealthiest hedge fund manager after George Soros. In 2014 he reportedly earned $1.1 billion, including a share of his firm's management and performance fees, cash compensation and stock and option awards. In 2018, Dalio was estimated to have personally received $2 billion in compensation for the year, after his fund posted a 14.6% return.

According to Forbes, Dalio has an estimated net worth of $20 billion as of January 21, 2022, ranking him 88th on their billionaires list and 36th on the Forbes 400 list. In January 2022, Bloomberg News reported Dalio's net worth as $15.7 billion, making him the world's 123rd-richest person according to their rankings.

Philanthropy 

In April 2011, Dalio and his wife joined Bill Gates and Warren Buffett's Giving Pledge, vowing to donate more than half his fortune to charitable causes within his lifetime. He created the Dalio Foundation, which serves as his personal philanthropic vehicle. By the end of 2012, the Dalio foundation had built up assets of $590 million. In 2013, Dalio contributed another $400 million to the foundation, which increased its assets to about $842 million.

Through his foundation, Dalio has directed millions in donations to the David Lynch Foundation, which promotes and sponsors research on Transcendental Meditation.

The Dalio Foundation has also contributed to the National Philanthropic Trust, to polio eradication projects.

Dalio has sat on NewYork–Presbyterian Hospital's board of trustees since 2020. In February 2020, the Dalio Foundation donated $10 million to support China's coronavirus recovery efforts in response to the COVID-19 pandemic. In March 2020, the foundation gave $4 million to the state of Connecticut to fund healthcare and nutrition. On October 13, 2020, NYP launched the Dalio Center for Health Justice, a research and advocacy organization, which will focus on reducing differences in access to quality health care that overwhelmingly affect communities of color with a gift of $50 million. The money was used to establish the Dalio Center for Health Justice. In a statement, Dalio said, "Our goal is to contribute to equal healthcare and equal education because we believe that these are the most fundamental building blocks of equal opportunity and a just society."

The foundation has also supported the Fund for Teachers, an initiative that supports professional learning fellowships for teachers. The foundation was part of a group of foundations supporting the 2018 launch of TED's Audacious Project, an initiative to fund social entrepreneurs working to solve global issues. In March 2019, Forbes named Dalio one of the highest-earning hedge fund managers and traders. A special focus of his philanthropy is the world's oceans and the effects of damaging them. Dalio's research yacht and submarine have appeared on the Discovery Channel during Shark Week and have been used to hunt for a giant squid. In 2018, OceanX, an initiative of the Dalio family, and Bloomberg Philanthropies committed $185 million over four years to protect the oceans. In 2019, Dalio pledged $100 million to Connecticut public schools.

Dalio has also backed the Volcker Alliance, the public policy group headed by former Federal Reserve chair Paul Volcker.

Overall, the Dalio family has donated more than $5 billion to his foundation, and the foundation has given out more than $1 billion in charitable grants.

Hobbies 
Dalio is an avid outdoorsman, and enjoys both hunting and fishing. He has hunted cape buffalo, grouse, elk, and warthog. He is especially fond of bow-hunting, which is his weapon of choice when hunting.

Published works 

How the Economic Machine Works; A Template for Understanding What is Happening Now is Dalio's first book, published in 2007. In it, he describes the economy as a machine. His stated aim for the book was to explain how the economic machine works, as he saw many people did not understand. By defining money properly as credit instead of aggregates (currency plus M1, M2 money supply etc.), the total amount of debt in the U.S. is $50 trillion, whereas the total amount of money is $3 trillion. Dalio explains the government "prints" money and uses it to combat some of the consequences of contracting credit. This is reflected in money growing at an extremely fast rate at the same time as credit and real economic activity contract. Dalio argues that if the money printing occurs on a large enough level, it devalues the currency, decreases interest rates and drives investors from financial assets to inflation hedge assets.

Principles: Life & Work is Dalio's second book, published in 2017 by Simon and Schuster. It was a New York Times #1 bestseller and Amazon's #1 business book of 2017. The catalyst for the book was a frank memo from his top lieutenants in 1993 about his interpersonal performance as a manager at Bridgewater Associates. Following the harsh but realistic critique, Dalio began to develop a unique company culture based on principles and unadorned feedback. He originally published a shorter version of Principles online in 2011, which received over three million downloads. He has announced that he will write a second volume, Principles: Economics & Investing. Dalio has said that he could continue improving his returns by solidifying recurring lessons into "principles".

Principles for Navigating Big Debt Crises is Dalio's third book, published in 2018. In it, he provides a substructure for interpreting the mechanics of large debt plights. Dalio sets out six stages, from the roots of the crisis to its rectification. He analyzes 48 historical examples of debt crises when real GDP growth fell by 3% or more, in various historical economies, including developed and prosperous countries as well as emerging economies. Dalio categorizes big debt crises into two types—deflationary and inflationary—and provides historical and economic contexts for both, as well as lessons that can be learned from them. The first type of debt crisis is deflationary. Dalio says that deflationary debt rotations generally happen when the majority of debt is denominated in a country’s own currency. An example of a country with this type of issue is Japan. Dalio believes it is possible for legislators to handle these scenarios relatively well, but even a good end result will be extremely costly to some people. The second type of scenario is inflationary. Inflationary debt cycles occur when most debt is denominated in foreign currencies. This situation makes it harder for a country’s policymakers to adjust risk and spread it out, a key step in resolving the crisis. Dalio says that the legislators must choose the beneficiaries and who suffers. This process often necessitates a need to recapitalize systemically important institutions, such as large banks.

Dalio's newest book, The Changing World Order: Why Nations Succeed and Fail, was published on November 16, 2021.

Awards and honors

In 2012, Dalio received the Golden Plate Award of the American Academy of Achievement presented by Carlyle Group co-founder David Rubenstein, during the International Achievement Summit in Washington, D.C. CNBC listed Principles among the 13 Best Business Books of 2017. Dalio was called the "Steve Jobs of Investing" by aiCIO Magazine and Wired Magazine.

See also
Criticism of capitalism
Wealth inequality in the United States

References

External links
 

1949 births
American billionaires
American commodities traders
American derivatives traders
American financiers
American hedge fund managers
American investors
American money managers
American people of Italian descent
American stock traders
Businesspeople from Greenwich, Connecticut
Giving Pledgers
21st-century philanthropists
Harvard Business School alumni
Long Island University alumni
People from Jackson Heights, Queens
Stock and commodity market managers
Living people
American business writers
Chief investment officers